The Big Desert Wilderness Park is a protected area in the Australian state of Victoria, Australia located in the state's west adjoining the border with South Australia.  It is the oldest of Victoria's three wilderness parks.

It includes part of the Big Desert and also adjoins Ninety Mile Desert across the border in South Australia. As it is a dedicated wilderness area, there are no facilities of any kind, including toilets or campsites. However, hiking and small fuel stoves are permitted. The wilderness park is overlapped by the Wyperfeld, Big Desert and Ngarkat Important Bird Area which  identified as such by BirdLife International because of its importance for the conservation of malleefowl and other species of mallee birds.

A large bushfire was ignited by lightning in the park in 2002 then spread rapidly due to strong winds and dry fuel.

See also
 Protected areas of Victoria (Australia)

External links
Big Desert Wilderness Park, Parks Victoria

References

Wilderness parks of Victoria (Australia)
Mallee Woodlands and Shrublands